Other Voices, Too (A Trip Back to Bountiful) was a 1998 album by Nanci Griffith. It was her thirteenth studio album. Following on from the Grammy Award winning album Other Voices, Other Rooms, Other Voices, Too (A Trip Back to Bountiful) is a second album of cover songs written by a wide variety of singer/songwriters.

The album includes many guest performances from musicians, including Guy Clark, The Crickets, Odetta, Lucinda Williams, Rodney Crowell, Steve Earle, Lyle Lovett, John Prine, Emmylou Harris, Gillian Welch, Jimmie Dale Gilmore and Richard Thompson.

Critical reception
People wrote that "not only does this album benefit from the sweet growl of Griffith’s sensuous voice, it also reflects her wondrous curiosity and eclectic tastes in music."

Track listing
"Wall of Death" (Richard Thompson) 3:09
"Who Knows Where The Time Goes" (Sandy Denny) 5:34
"You Were On My Mind" (Sylvia Fricker) 2:46
"Walk Right Back" (Sonny Curtis) 2:33
"Canadian Whiskey" (Tom Russell) 2:59
"Desperados Waiting for a Train" (Guy Clark) 4:16
"Wings of a Dove" (Bob Ferguson) 2:51
"Dress of Laces" (John Grimaudo, Saylor White) 4:55
"Summer Wages" (Ian Tyson) 4:02
"He Was a Friend of Mine" (Traditional) 3:11
"Hard Times Come Again No More" (Stephen Collins Foster) 5:43
"Wasn't That a Mighty Storm" (Traditional) 5:01
"Deportee (Plane Wreck at Los Gatos)" (Woody Guthrie, Martin Hoffman) 5:21
"Yarrington Town" (Mickie Merkens) 4:23
"I Still Miss Someone" (Johnny Cash, Roy Cash Jr) 3:38
"Try The Love" (Pat McLaughlin) 3:45
"The Streets of Baltimore" (Harlan Howard, Tompall Glaser) 2:35
"Darcy Farrow" (Tom Campbell, Steve Gillette) 2:33
"If I Had a Hammer (The Hammer Song)" (Pete Seeger, Lee Hays) 2:48

Personnel
 Nanci Griffith - vocals, acoustic guitar, gut-string guitar
 Meghann Ahern – gut-string guitar
 J. I. Allison – drums
 Shawn Camp – vocals
 Nollaig Casey – fiddle
 John Catchings – cello
 Frank Christian – vocals, acoustic guitar, gut-string guitar, 12-string guitar 
 Guy Clark – vocals, acoustic guitar 
 Susan Cowsill – vocals, gut-string guitar
 Rodney Crowell – vocals duet, acoustic guitar 
 Sonny Curtis – acoustic guitar, gut-string guitar
 Mary Custy – fiddle
 Ron de la Vega – vocals, bass, cello, gut-string guitar, tic tac
 Philip Donnelly  – vocals, acoustic guitar 
 Steve Earle – vocals, gut-string guitar
 Béla Fleck – banjo
 Nina Gerber – acoustic guitar 
 Jimmie Dale Gilmore – vocals
 Julie Gold – gut-string guitar
 Clive Gregson – electric guitar, gut-string guitar
 Andrew Hardin – vocals, acoustic guitar, tiple 
 Emmylou Harris – vocals, gut-string guitar
 Jamie Hartford – vocals
 Bill Hearne – gut-string guitar, acoustic guitar 
 Bonnie Hearne – gut-string guitar
 Carolyn Hester – gut-string guitar
 Tish Hinojosa – vocals, gut-string guitar
 Peter Holsapple – mandolin
 James Hooker – vocals, gut-string guitar, organ, piano, synthesizer 
 Jay Joyce – vocals, gut-string guitar
 Lucy Kaplansky – vocals, gut-string guitar
 Fats Kaplin – button accordion, fiddle, pedal steel
 Dolores Keane – gut-string guitar
 Mary Ann Kennedy – vocals
 Maura Kennedy – vocals, gut-string guitar
 Pete Kennedy – vocals, gut-string guitar, 12-string guitar
 Ray Kennedy – vocals
 Doug Lancio – vocals, acoustic guitar, electric guitar, gut-string guitar, resonator guitar 
 Tom Littlefield – vocals
 Lyle Lovett – gut-string guitar
 Ian Matthews – vocals, acoustic guitar 
 Joe Mauldin – bass
 Pat McInerney – drums, percussion, vocals, gut-string guitar
 Pat McLaughlin – vocals, acoustic guitar, mandolin 
 John Mock – penny whistle
 Odetta – vocals, gut-string guitar
 David Olney – vocals
 John Prine – duet vocals
 Jean Ritchie – vocals, gut-string guitar
 Jim Rooney – vocals, gut-string guitar
 Darius Rucker – gut-string guitar
 Tom Rush – vocals, slide guitar
 Tom Russell – vocals, gut-string guitar
 Matthew Ryan – vocals, gut-string guitar
 Lee Satterfield – vocals, mandolin
 Sharon Shannon – button accordion
 Jim Sonefeld – gut-string guitar
 Rosalie Sorrels – vocals, gut-string guitar
 John Stewart – vocals, gut-string guitar
 Eric Taylor – vocals, gut-string guitar
 Christian Teal – violin
 Richard Thompson – Vocals, electric guitar, gut-string guitar
 Ian Tyson – vocals
 Dave Van Ronk – acoustic guitar
 Eric Von Schmidt – gut-string guitar
 Jerry Jeff Walker – acoustic guitar, vocals 
 Eric Weissberg – banjo, gut-string guitar
 Gillian Welch – gut-string guitar
 Kristin Wilkinson – viola
 Lucinda Williams – acoustic guitar, vocals 
 Jim Williamson – trumpet
 Brian Willoughby – acoustic guitar

References

1998 albums
Covers albums
Nanci Griffith albums
Albums produced by Don Gehman
Elektra Records albums